Fiorella Aíta Junek (born 13 July 1977) is a Peruvian volleyball player. She competed in the women's tournament at the 2000 Summer Olympics.

References

External links
 

1977 births
Living people
Peruvian women's volleyball players
Olympic volleyball players of Peru
Volleyball players at the 2000 Summer Olympics
Sportspeople from Lima
20th-century Peruvian women
21st-century Peruvian women